Acalolepta laevifrons is a species of beetle in the family Cerambycidae. It was described by Per Olof Christopher Aurivillius in 1923. It is known from the Philippines, Malaysia, Sumatra, and Borneo.

References

Acalolepta
Beetles described in 1923